The 2015–16 season was Newport County's third consecutive season in League Two and 63rd season in the Football League. The season covered the period from 1 July 2015 to 30 June 2016. It was their 95th season of league football and 27th since reforming in 1989. They finished the season in 22nd place. The club also participated in the FA Cup, League Cup and League Trophy, reaching Round 3 of the FA Cup for the first time since 1986.

Season Review

League
Former England Manager Terry Butcher had been announced as manager in April, but his tenure lasted a mere ten games. During that spell County recorded only one win and seven losses, and lay rooted at the foot of the table. His replacement John Sheridan was announced on 2 October. Sheridan managed to get county out of the relegation places and up to 20th in the table by 12 January 2016 when he was poached by former club Oldham Athletic. He had enjoyed a ten-match unbeaten run between mid-20 October and 1 December, with an overall record of five wins, five defeats and seven draws from 17 games in charge. After three defeats and a draw in his last four games he left with County just three points above the relegation zone. Assistant manager Warren Feeney was announced as manager on 15 January. Feeney's tenure started with a win at York City, but he only managed another five wins in the rest of the season. County had risen as high as 17th in the table following the 3–0 win at Portsmouth and 0–0 draw home to Hartlepool United, but a disastrous spell of six straight defeats left them in 22nd place 11 points clear of relegation with 12 left to play for. A 1–1 draw with  Oxford United combined with York's win at Portsmouth put County nine points ahead with nine to play for, but with an 11 superior goal difference. Any relegation doubts were extinguished by Newport's 1–1 draw at Luton. However the bad results continued for the remainder of the season and into the next, which ultimately cost Feeny his job. Newport lost the last two games of this season and failed to score a single goal, finishing in 22nd place.

Cup
In the first round of the League Cup, Newport travelled to Wolverhampton Wanderers. Despite taking the lead in the 6th minute, the scores were level by the 15th, with County eventually losing 2–1 due to a 58th-minute Wolves penalty.

In the League Trophy Newport were home to Swindon Town. With the game finishing 1–1 it entered a penalty shootout. With Aaron Collins missing the seventh penalty and Will Randall scoring his, Swindon went through 7–6.

In the FA Cup, County were drawn away in the first round to Conference North qualifiers Brackley Town. Newport were leading 2–1 in stoppage time, until former County player Curtis McDonald headed home a 95th-minute equaliser to force a replay. That game was won 4–1 to set up a second round game with fellow League Two side Barnet. Newport recorded a 1–0 victory at The Hive to progress to the third round for the first time since 1986. The third-round game at home to Championship side Blackburn Rovers started in the worst possible way for County with Rovers taking the lead thanks to an 8th-minute penalty. Mark Byrne equalised for County from 25 yards on 30 minutes to leave the scores 1–1 at half time. With 15 minutes remaining in the game Jordan Rhodes scored the winner for Rovers to send them into the 4th round.

Results summary

Results by round

Transfers

Transfers in

Loans in

Transfers out

Loans out

Managerial statistics 
Only competitive games from the 2015–16 season are included.

Competitions

Pre-season friendlies
On 20 May 2015, Newport County announced their first four friendlies against Undy, Port Talbot Town, Bath City and Eastleigh. A fifth against Weston-super-Mare was added on 21 May. On 11 July 2015, Newport County added a trip to Torquay United.

League Two

League Cup

Football League Trophy

On 8 August 2015, live on Soccer AM the draw for the first round of the Football League Trophy was drawn by Toni Duggan and Alex Scott.

FA Cup

References

Newport County
Newport County A.F.C. seasons
New